Tanjore Ranganathan (born Madras, India, 13 March 1925 - died 22 December 1987) was a Carnatic musician specializing in percussion instruments, particularly the mridangam, having studied under Palani Subramaniam Pillai.

Ranganathan began performing professionally in 1938.  At the California Institute of the Arts and Wesleyan University he taught many non-Indians Carnatic music, including Robert E. Brown, John Bergamo, Jon B. Higgins, Douglas Knight, David Nelson, Royal Hartigan, David Moss, Glenn "Rusty" Gillette, and Craig Woodson.  He began teaching at Wesleyan in 1963, becoming that university's first Artist in Residence in Music.

Ranganathan's younger brother was the Carnatic flute player and vocalist T. Viswanathan (1927-2002).  The two recorded the music for the Satyajit Ray documentary film Bala (1976), about their elder sister, the bharatanatyam dancer Balasaraswati.

The American composer Henry Cowell composed the mridangam part in his Madras Symphony especially for T. Ranganathan.

Ranganathan died after a long illness, at the age of 62. He was survived by his wife Edwina, and sons Suddhama and Arun.

References

External links
T. Ranganathan page by David Nelson
Obituary from The New York Times

See also
Ramnad Raghavan
S. Ramanathan

1925 births
1987 deaths
Mridangam players
Wesleyan University faculty
Musicians from Chennai
Indian music educators
20th-century Indian musicians
20th-century drummers